Dauria is a 1971 Soviet historical action/drama set in Siberia, Russia. Adapted from the novel of the same name by Konstantin Sedykh and directed by Viktor Tregubovich. 
 
While the movie was criticized by some Soviet critics for its historical inaccuracies, its epic scope and intense battle scenes won wide praise and has been credited with affecting the political landscape of Siberian Russia.

Plot 
Epic film about traditional life of Cossacks in the Siberian province of Dauria at the time of the communist revolution. Focused on a Cossack village that is living like one big family under the guidance of a strong leader - Ataman (Kopelyan).

Young Cossack Roman Ulybin (Solomin) is in love with beautiful Dashutka (Golovina). Roman is asking his father, Severian Ulybin (Shelokhonov), to send a Matchmaker (Shukshina) before it's too late. But father Severian has no money, while wealthy crook has already hired the Matchmaker, and his son gets married at the lavish traditional wedding with singing, dancing and drinking in the Russian style.

So, frustrated Roman Ulybin leaves his father's home to follow his big brother Vasili, a Communist leader who promises happiness after the revolution. But, after the revolution, people suffer a cascade of troubles. Good old traditional life is destroyed by chaos, lawlessness and crime. Greed and envy blinds many people, and they forget their good traditions and life as good neighbors. Cossack leader Ataman is brutally beaten and humiliated by executioner. Roman's father, Severian, is murdered in a wrongful dispute, and Roman is too late to reconcile with his father.

Cast
 Vitali Solomin as Roman Ulybin. The son of Severian
 Petr Shelokhonov as Severian Ulybin. The father of Roman
 Yefim Kopelyan as Ataman Kargin, the leader of Cossacks
 Vasily Shukshin as Vasili Ulybin, the leader of Communists
 Yury Solomin as Semen, a Communist agent
 Mikhail Kokshenov as Fedot, the neighbor of Ulybins
 Arkadi Trusov as Grandfather Ulybin
 Vera Kuznetsova as Ulybina. The wife of Severian
 Viktor Pavlov as Nikifor, a hard core Cossack
 Svetlana Golovina as Dashutka, the love interest of Roman Ulybin
 Zhenya Malyantsev as Roman's little brother
 Fyodor Odinokov as Dashutka's father
 Lyubov Malinovskaya as Dashutka's mother
 Yuri Nazarov as a runaway prisoner
 Vsevolod Kuznetsov as Cossack Platon Volokitin
 Lidiya Fedoseyeva-Shukshina as Matchmaker
 Zinovi Gerdt as Tsarist General Semenov
 Georgi Shtil as Anarchist Revolutionary
 Igor Yefimov as Cossack
 Dmitri Masanov as Cossack
 Vladimir Losev as Cossack
 Sergei Polezhaev as White Russian officer
 Aleksandr Demyanenko as Executioner
 Igor Dmitriev as Executioner

Crew
Director: Viktor Tregubovich
Writers: Konstantin Sedykh, Yuri Klepikov, Viktor Tregubovich
Cinematographer: Yevgeny Mezentsev
Composer: Gennady Portnov
Production Designer: Grachya Mekinyan

Production 
 Produced by Lenfilm studios.
 Filming dates 1969-1971.
 Filming locations: Siberia, Trans-Baikal region, Narva, Estonia, Lenfilm studios, Leningrad, Russia.
 Over 5 hundred extras took part in filming.
 Leading actors took horseback riding classes for several months before and during filming.
 A unique stunt was performed for the character of Severian Ulybin: live horse with a mannequin in a Cossack costume jumped down from 70-meters-high cliff into the cold river.

Release 
 1971 theatrical release, Soviet Union
 1975 theatrical release in Finland and other European nations
 1985 VHS release, Soviet Union
 2002 DVD release, worldwide

Reception
 Attendance: 47 million, theatrical, in the Soviet Union.

DVD release
 2002 DVD released by RUSCICO. It is based on the shorter 182 minute version, which was edited for European release in 1975. Dubbing for DVD in three languages was made by professional actors in English, French, and Russian. Subtitles in Arabic, Chinese, Dutch, French, English, German, Hebrew, Italian, Japanese, Portuguese, Russian, Spanish, and Swedish. 
 Defects on DVD include errors in sequence of scenes and wrong listing of scenes in the DVD cover booklet. There are some mistakes and discrepancies between English and Russian versions of the DVD.

References

External links 
 
 Filming Dauria scenes in Siberia 

1971 films
Lenfilm films
Russian Civil War films
1971 romantic drama films
War romance films
Soviet war drama films
Films set in Siberia
Films shot in Estonia
Films shot in Siberia
Films based on Russian novels
Soviet epic films